Cheikh Sarr is a Senegalese basketball coach. He is the current coach for the Rwanda national basketball team. He coached Senegal at the 2014 FIBA Basketball World Cup.

Career
From 2012 to 2015, Sarr was the head coach of the Senegal national basketball team. At the 2014 FIBA Basketball World Cup, he helped the team reach the second round for the first time in the nation's history.
In 2018, he repeated the same performance with th senegalese women's national team in Tenerife where the World Women's Basketball has been held.

He later extended his contract until 2023. In March 2022, his contract has been extended for 2 more years with FERWABA (March 2024).

Personal
Sarr is a native of Joal-Fadiouth where he was born in 1968 (July 25th). He went to "CAMP GMI -Thies" Primary school before continuing his medal school classes at Amady Coly Diop (ex Camp Faidherbe) and finished his high school degree at Lycee Malick Sy where he earned a scientific diploma (Bac D). at his younger age, he played many sports (Volleyball, handball, soccer, high jump, etc.) but basketball was his favorite. he spent all his youth playing at US Rail Club in Thies under Coach Gora Mbaye. When he reached 18 years old, he decided to stop playing in order to focus on his studies. Later, he continues with US Goree club after succeeding to INSEPS first year entry in 1992.
Cheikh Sarr is a FIBA instructor of instructors and holds a PhD in sports psychology and a Master's degree in educational leadership (University of Delaware), amongst numerous educational accreditations.

Honours
Senegal
 Zone 2 Cabo verde 2012
 AfroBasket 2013
 AfroBasket 2019

References

Living people
Basketball coaches
Year of birth missing (living people)
Senegalese basketball coaches